The indigo snake (Drymarchon corais) is a species of snake of the family Colubridae. This large colubrid snake is nonvenomous.

Taxonomy
Until recently, all Drymarchon were classified as subspecies of D. corais. However, North and Central populations are now assigned to different species (D. melanurus, D. couperi and D. kolpobasileus), and D. caudomaculatus and D. margaritae are recognised as separate species in South America.

Range
This snake is found in South America, including Brazil, Colombia, Ecuador, French Guiana, Guyana, Peru, Suriname and Venezuela as well as Trinidad and Tobago.

Diet
The species forages on the ground, sometimes climbing low vegetation. It feeds on a variety of prey species including fish, frogs, reptiles, reptile eggs, mammals, birds and bird eggs.

References 

Reptiles described in 1827
Colubrids
Reptiles of South America
Reptiles of Brazil
Reptiles of Ecuador
Reptiles of Peru
Reptiles of Suriname